Addison Jayne Timlin (born June 29, 1991) is an American actress, best known for her roles as Jami Lerner in The Town That Dreaded Sundown (2014) and Colleen Lunsford in Little Sister (2016). She is also known for playing Sasha Bingham in Showtime's Californication.

Career
Born in Philadelphia, Pennsylvania, Timlin debuted on the big screen as Amy, a 14-year-old girl with diabetes, in the 2005 film Derailed alongside Clive Owen and Melissa George, who played her parents. Timlin played Maddy in a short film, The Isabel Fish, directed by Lara Zizic for the Columbia Film Festival. In 2007, Timlin appeared in the music video, "Sleeping Lessons", by Albuquerque, New Mexico based indie-rock band, The Shins. In 2008, she made an appearance in the music video for the song "Check Yes Juliet" by We the Kings, playing the fictional Juliet. She was cast in the short-lived CBS television drama, 3 lbs, as Charlotte Hanson (the daughter of the main character played by Stanley Tucci), in three of the eight episodes that were filmed. Timlin is seen in the short film Man, written and directed by Myna Joseph, which was screened at the Sundance Film Festival and at Cannes. In 2008 she played Emily Draper in the ABC television show, Cashmere Mafia, the troubled teenage daughter of Juliet Draper (Miranda Otto).

Timlin was cast in Day One, an NBC midseason replacement TV series which was cut down to a mini-series that never aired. In the fourth season of Californication she portrayed Sasha Bingham, an actress who is in a casual sexual relationship with protagonist Hank Moody (David Duchovny). Timlin appeared in an indie film called Best Man Down which starred Justin Long. She played the female lead, Stormy Llewellyn, in Stephen Sommers' adaptation of the first book of Dean Koontz’s Odd Thomas series, opposite Anton Yelchin as the title character. In February 2012, Timlin was cast in ABC's drama pilot, Zero Hour, which was picked up as a mid-season replacement and premiered in February 2013. In May that same year, Timlin joined the cast of the indie romantic comedy, The Bounceback. In 2013, Timlin appeared in the action-comedy Stand Up Guys, which starred Al Pacino, Christopher Walken and Alan Arkin.

Timlin was cast as Lucinda "Luce" Price in 2016's Fallen, adapted from Lauren Kate's novel. 

In 2016, Timlin was cast as a female lead in CBS's drama pilot MacGyver, but was dropped from the cast when the network picked up pilot to series. In 2017, Timlin was cast in the second season of Crackle's show StartUp. She played a young Hillary Clinton in the 2019 film When I'm a Moth.

Personal life
Timlin married actor Jeremy Allen White on October 18, 2019. The couple have two daughters (born in October 2018 and December 2020).

Filmography

Film

Television

References

External links
 
 

1991 births
Living people
21st-century American actresses
Actresses from Philadelphia
American child actresses
American film actresses
American television actresses